Shorter Views is a 2000 collection of essays on race, sexuality, science fiction, and the art of writing by author, professor, and critic Samuel R. Delany.

References

Books by Samuel Delany
Essay collections
Science fiction studies
Wesleyan University Press books